This is a list of films which have placed number one at the weekend box office in the United States during 2005.

Number-one films

Highest-grossing films

Calendar Gross
Highest-grossing films of 2005 by Calendar Gross

In-Year Release

See also
List of American films — American films by year
List of box office number-one films

References

Chronology

2005
United States
2005 in American cinema